Piya Naam Ka Diya (English: Lamp of beloved's name) is a 2019 Pakistani romantic drama serial directed by Saleem Ghanchi, written by Samra Bukhari, produced by Abdullah Kadwani and Asad Qureshi under the 7th Sky Entertainment banner. The serial stars Saniya Shamshad, Yashma Gill and Farhan Ahmed Malhi. The serial was released in July 2019 on Geo Entertainment.

Cast 
 Farhan Ahmed Malhi as Waqas
 Saniya Shamshad as Naila
 Hammad Farooqui as Babar
 Ali Rizvi as Gulzar
 Tipu Shareef as Ishtiaq
 Arez Ahmed as Shayaan
 Madiha Rizvi as Razia
 Zainab Shabbir as Aaliya
 Mariya Khan as Shaheen
 Haris Waheed as Hammad
 Yashma Gill as Ramsha
 Hira Tareen as Roshanay
 Parveen Akhtar as Roshanay's mother

Reception 

The show became very popular and crossed 10+ TRPs, and has been released on Viu under the same title in the end of 2019.

Soundtrack 
The original soundtrack for Piya Naam Ka Diya is sang and composed by Sahir Ali Bagga while the lyrics are provided by M. Mujtaba Sunny.

References

External links 

2019 Pakistani television series debuts
Pakistani television series
Urdu-language television shows